Mykhailo Oleksiyovych Burmystenko (22 November 1902 – 20 September 1941) was a Ukrainian and Soviet politician, who served as the Chairman of the Supreme Soviet Ukrainian SSR from 1938 to 1941. Burmystenko died during the Battle of Kiev in 1941 and a memorial remains there in his memory.

Biography
Burmystenko was born in the village of Aleksandrovka in Saratov Governorate, Central Russia.

In 1912 he graduated from the parish school in the Semirichen Oblast of Russian Turkestan, and in 1918 he graduated from the Morshansk Soviet vocational school of the 2nd degree in Tambov province. He joined the Komsomol in 1918 serving from that year into 1919 as Secretary, Chairman of the Morshan County Committee of the Komsomol of Tambov province. He joined the Communist Party of the Soviet Union (CPSU) in 1919.

From 1919–1920 he was an employee of the Transport Emergency Commission (CHC) of the city of Morshansk. From June – October 1920 he was Assistant Commissioner, then Commissioner. From October 1920 through May 1922 he served as head of the Information Department, Deputy Chief of the secret part of the Transport Emergency Commission (Cheka) of the city of Penza. From June – October 1922 he was the head of the Information Department of the (CHC) of the city of Pokrovsk Labor Community of the Volga Germans.

From October 1922 – September 1923 he was head of the political education department of the Regional Committee of the Komsomol of the Labor Community of the Volga Germans. In September – October 1923, he was a student at the Communist University, Petrograd.

From October 1923 – April 1924 he served with the DPU with authorization from the special department of the DPU of the 33rd Division of the Workers' and Peasants' Red Army (РСЧА) of the Western Front. From May 1924 – December 1926 he was Chief of the Political Secretariat of the Regional Military Commissariat of the USSR of the Volga Germans.

From December 1926 – March 1927 he was Deputy Editor-in-Chief, and from April – December 1927 Editor-in-Chief of the regional newspaper of the German Autonomous Soviet Socialist Republic of the Volga region "Trudovaya Pravda" in Pokrovsk.

December 1927 – July 1929:  student of the editorial department of the Communist State Institute of Journalism in Moscow, where he received a diploma with his specialty in newspaper journalism.

August 1929 – January 1932: Editor-in-Chief of the regional newspaper of the Autonomous Soviet Socialist Republic of the Volga region "Labor Truth" in Pokrovsk (Engelsi).

February 1932 – November 1935: 2nd Secretary of the Kalmyk Regional Committee of the CPSU.

January 1936 – August 1937: instructor, then from August 1937 – January 1938 was Deputy Head of the Department of governing party bodies of the Central Committee of the CPSU.

27 January to 13 June 1938: Acting 2nd Secretary of the Communist Party of Ukraine (CPU), from 18 June 1938 to 9 September 1941 he served as Second Secretary of the CPU. From 27 January 1938 he was a member of the Politburo of the Central Committee of the CPU.

On 26 June 1938 he was elected a deputy to the Parliament of Ukraine (Verkhovna Rada) of the USSR of the 1st convocation of the Vinnytsia city election district of Vinnytsia region. At the first session of the first elected Verkhovna Rada of the USSR on 25 July 1938 he was elected Chairman of the Supreme Soviet of the Ukrainian SSR (Soviet Socialist Republic).

World War II and death

From the beginning of the German-Soviet War, he was engaged in the organization of sabotage units in Ukraine.

In August 1941 he was appointed a member of the Military Council of the Southwestern Front. As part of the command of the front he was surrounded during the defense of Kyiv . He died on 20 September 1941 in the village of Shumeykove near the village of Iskivtsi in Lokhvytsky district, Poltava region, while trying to escape from enemy encirclement.

Awards and honors

Order of Lenin (2 February 1939, for outstanding achievements in agriculture)

Order of the Patriotic War of the 1st degree (posthumously)

References

External links
 Chronos
 Handbook in history of the Communist Party and the Soviet Union 1898 – 1991

1902 births
1941 deaths
People from Saratov Oblast
People from Atkarsky Uyezd
Bolsheviks
First convocation members of the Soviet of Nationalities
Politburo of the Central Committee of the Communist Party of Ukraine (Soviet Union) members
Chairmen of the Verkhovna Rada of the Ukrainian Soviet Socialist Republic
First convocation members of the Verkhovna Rada of the Ukrainian Soviet Socialist Republic
Soviet military personnel killed in World War II
Recipients of the Order of Lenin